Joseph and Aseneth is a narrative that dates from between 200 BCE and 200 CE. The first part of the story (chapters 1-21), an expansion of Genesis 41:45, describes the diffident relationship between Aseneth, the daughter of an Egyptian priest of Heliopolis and the Hebrew patriarch Joseph, the vision of Aseneth in which she is fed honeycomb by a heavenly being, her subsequent conversion to the God of Joseph, followed by romance, marriage, and the birth of Manasseh and Ephraim. The second part (chapters 22-29) involves a plot by the Pharaoh's son, who recruits Dan and Gad to kill Joseph, only to be thwarted by Benjamin and Levi.

The work was composed in Greek, attested by sixteen Greek manuscripts, and other sources. The oldest existing manuscript is a Syriac translation, contained in British Library manuscript #17,202, an anthology that contains a variety of writings. The Syriac translation of Joseph and Aseneth was made around 550 CE by Moses of Ingila. The anthology was compiled around 570 CE by an individual whom scholars call "Pseudo-Zacharias Rhetor."

Some have regarded it as a Jewish midrash or elaboration on the story in Genesis (Genesis 37–50). Others question this interpretation partly because of its provenance (early Syriac Christianity), language (Son of God, Bride of God), symbolism (Eucharistic) and covering letter which appear to indicate a Christian context. Gideon Bohak and others have drawn attention to the geographical location of the story (Heliopolis) and an important Jewish diaspora community centered on a Jewish temple in Leontopolis, located in the nome of Heliopolis during the Ptolemaic period, seeing this as the likely starting point.

History of the Syriac manuscript
In 1870 J.P.N. Land published a transcription of Joseph and Aseneth in the third series of Anecdota Syriaca, using British Library manuscript #17,202.

The British Library acquired manuscript #17,202 from the British Museum. That institution purchased it on November 11, 1847, from an Egyptian merchant by the name of Auguste Pacho, a native of Alexandria. It had come from an ancient Syrian monastery, St. Mary Deipara, in the Nitrian desert in Egypt, where it had been housed for over 900 years.

Around 932, the monastery's abbot, Moses the Nisibene, acquired over 250 manuscripts from Mesopotamia and Syria for the library. One of these is the manuscript we know as British Library #17,202.

From the 10th century back to the 6th century the manuscript was in Mesopotamia. In the 6th century we can pick up the trail. Manuscript #17,202 is an anthology, a collection of a number of important writings compiled by an anonymous Syriac author called by scholars Pseudo-Zacharias Rhetor. He labelled his anthology A Volume of Records of Events Which Have Happened in the World. He was likely a monk.
This Syriac anthology dates from around 570. It contains the oldest existing version of Joseph and Aseneth.

The compiler is called "Pseudo-Zacharias Rhetor" because one of the items found in his anthology is an important church history by the real Zacharias Rhetor. Pseudo-Zacharias Rhetor, whoever he was, did not compose these documents: he compiled them. In the case of Joseph and Aseneth he used the existing Syriac translation that had been made by Moses of Ingila.

Careful edition was edited by E.W. Brooks , Historia ecclesiastica Zachariae Rhetori vulgo adscripta (CSCO 83; Paris, 1919, reprinted 1053), vol 1, pp. 21-55; Latin translation by the same, Historia ecclesiastica Zachariae Rhetori vulgo adscripta (CSCO 87 Louvain, 1924, reprinted 1953), vol. 1, pp. 15-39.

Two covering letters to Joseph and Aseneth are included in the compilation and they record how this Syriac translation came to be made. An anonymous Syriac individual, probably a monk, had been looking at manuscripts in Resh'aina (near the border of modern-day Turkey and Syria) in a library belonging to the line of bishops who had come from Aleppo. This individual came across what he termed "a small, very old book" written in Greek "Of Aseneth." The covering letter asks Moses of Ingila to translate it into Syriac, his Greek being rather rusty, and to tell him its "inner meaning".

The second covering letter provides Moses of Ingila's response. He says that the writing is a piece of wisdom literature whose inner meaning has to be carefully discerned. He cautions the anonymous monk to be careful. As he is about to disclose its Christological meaning affirming Christianity, the text is cut off.

Other manuscripts
There exist also forty-five Armenian manuscripts dated back to the sixth or the seventh centuries, falling into six groups, of which the most important is Matenadaran (Mashtots Institute of Ancient Manuscripts), Erevan, MS 1500 (A.D. 1282-1283) (=332).

Nine Latin manuscripts were possibly written in England and date back to circa A.D. 1200. Another Latin manuscript belongs to the University Library, Uppsala, MS C 37, beginning of the 13th century (=436). A final group of four manuscripts is headed by Monastery Library, Vorau (Austria), MS 136, 13th century (=435), Unpublished untill [sic] 1985.

Two Serbian-Slavonic manuscripts with minor variants are known, in addition to (at least) two illuminated Modern Greek manuscripts: Monastery of Koutloumousi, Mount Athos, MS 100, 16th century (=661); Bodleian Library, Oxford, Ms Roe 5, 1614 (=671).<ref>Miniatures of both of them were published by Gary Vikan,, Illuminated Manuscripts; miniatures of 661 published by S. M. Pelekanidis, P. C. Christou,  C. Tsiounis, and S. N. Kadas, The Treasures of Mount Athos. Illuminated Manuscripts, Miniatures-Headpieces-Initial Letters (Athens, 1974) vol. 1 pp. 456, 458f. figs. 339-341</ref>

 20th century interpretation history 
In 1918 E.W. Brooks published a translation and introduction to Joseph and Aseneth in which he wrote the following: "that the book in its present shape is the work of a Christian writer will be at once recognized by any reader."

Two English anthologies of Old Testament Apocrypha/Pseudepigrapha include translations of Joseph and Aseneth, all based on Greek manuscripts later than the oldest extant Syriac version. An introduction and translation by C. Burchard is included in James H. Charlesworth's The Old Testament Pseudepigrapha, volume 2. Similarly H.F.D. Sparks includes a translation by D. Cook in his The Apocryphal Old Testament. The inclusion of Joseph and Aseneth in these anthologies seem to suggest that the editors and translators were under the impression that the author was Jewish and that the work had something to do with Jewish apocryphal literature.

This accords with Burchard's judgment in 1985. He writes: "Every competent scholar has since Batiffol has maintained that Joseph and Aseneth is Jewish, with perhaps some Christian interpolations; no one has put the book much after A.D. 200, and some have placed it as early as the second century B.C. As to the place of origin, the majority of scholars look to Egypt."

A list of extant manuscripts and 20th century interpretation history can be found in the introductions to these two anthologies. Views as to origin include: written in Israel by an Orthodox Jew (Aptowitzer); in Israel written by an Essene (Riessler); in Alexandria Egypt composed by a member of the Therapeutae (K.G. Kuhn); and also in Egypt relating to the Jewish temple in the nome of Heliopolis (founded c. 170 BCE), in the same area as the geographical setting of the story (Bohak). Cook endorsed the view of an earlier French scholar, Marc Philonenko, who thought that it was written by a Jewish author around 100 CE. Its purpose, he maintained was twofold: to present inter-faith marriages between Gentiles and Jews in a positive light, and, secondly, to persuade Jews as to the advantages of such unions. Cook thought that this view was "likely."

All these authors contended that the author was Jewish and written around the dawn of the 1st century CE. And the anthologizers Charlesworth and Sparks seem to concur, with Charlesworth labelling the translation, "First Century B.C. – Second Century A.D."
Some recent scholars, however, have challenged that interpretation.

 Recent scholarship 
In the last two decades some scholars have argued that the work is fundamentally Christian. These include Ross Shepard Kraemer, When Aseneth Met Joseph; and Rivka Nir, Joseph and Aseneth: A Christian Book. 

According to Angela Standhartinger, a covering letter by Moses of Ingila included with the manuscript explains the story "as an allegory of Christ's marriage to the soul".

 As a lost Gospel encoding the Jesus bloodline 

A 2014 book by Simcha Jacobovici and Barrie Wilson, The Lost Gospel: Decoding the Ancient Text that Reveals Jesus' Marriage to Mary the Magdalene, argues for the marriage of Jesus to Mary Magdalene through a decoding of Joseph and Aseneth, according to the Jesus bloodline myth. The book has been compared to The Da Vinci Code in 2003, as a conspiracy theory.Assessing the Lost Gospel by Richard Bauckham 

The authors claim that the story of Joseph and Aseneth was already composed during Jesus' lifetime and precedes the canonical gospels.

The Syriac manuscript, being the oldest manuscript, and its accompanying cover letters are given great weight; the authors commissioned multi-spectral photography to "see through" smudges and other marks on the manuscript to ascertain the original underlying text. The translation into English was by Tony Burke, translator of  The Infancy Gospel of Thomas, author of Secret Scriptures Revealed, and editor of Fakes, Forgeries, and Fictions: Writing Ancient and Modern Christian Apocrypha''. Burke worked independently and was not informed of the overall project objectives. Burke also prepared the first-ever English translation of the two covering letters in Syriac, which was more difficult than translating the main text, owing to damage to the manuscript.

References

1st-century Christianity
6th-century Christian texts
Joseph (Genesis)
Syriac Christianity
Old Testament pseudepigrapha
Texts in Syriac
Jewish apocrypha